The 1940 Ole Miss Rebels football team represented the University of Mississippi in the 1940 college football season. The Rebels were led by third-year head coach Harry Mehre and played their home games at Hemingway Stadium in Oxford, Mississippi. They finished with a record of 9–2 (3–1 SEC), to finish third in the Southeastern Conference.

Schedule

References

Ole Miss
Ole Miss Rebels football seasons
Ole Miss Rebels football